National Dastak is an Indian web channel launched on 20 December 2015 and is focused on the issues of Bahujan and marginalised sections of India that are often ignored by mainstream media. Mr Shambhu Kumar Singh is the senior editor of National Dastak.

Content 

National Dastak is known for live reporting, political news and broadcasting documentaries. Its website was ranked 94,827th in popularity among websites in India in February 2019.

 its YouTube channel subscriptions had reached more than 6 million.

See also 
 Awaaz India TV
 Dalit Camera
 Lord Buddha TV

References

External links
 Official Website
 Official Channel

24-hour television news channels in India
Hindi-language television channels in India
Mass media companies of India
Dalit literature
2015 establishments in Delhi
Mass media in Delhi